Sanmen County (Tai-chow dialect: Sæn-meng Yön) is a coastal county under the jurisdiction of Taizhou city/municipality in the east of Zhejiang Province, People's Republic of China. The county's postal code is 317100. The county government is located at 59 Renmin Road, in the town of Haiyou.

The Sanmen Nuclear Power Station, the first power station to implement a AP1000 pressurized water reactor (PWR), can be found here.

History 
During the Qing Dynasty, the Chinese forced the Italians to give up on a demand to hand over Sanmen Bay to them. Since the Neolithic humans have been present in modern-day Sanmen County. Xia, suppliers, Zhou is Ouyue ground. Autumn belongs to the country, 306 BC, Chu eliminate Yue, the state of Chu. Qin, three under the central Fujian county. Han Hui Di three years (192 BC), three county Dongou country. Jianyuan six years, Three county to county. Emperor Han Zhao began yuan two years (85 BC), three belong answers riverside county to county. Eastern Han Guangwu period (25 AD), three genera County chapter. Three Dadi Dynasty (AD 222–252 years) Linhai County, three is a coastal county, belong to county. Wu Shaodi Taiping two years (AD 257), east to county Linhai County, three is a coastal county. Sui waste County for the state, county waste sea change into the State Department, three is a coastal county, Li Wu states. Emperor cause Dynasty (AD 605), and state for the county, three belong to Yongjia County. Tang Takenori first year (AD 618), Linhai County to the sea state, Takenori four years (AD 621) three Li Haizhou. Takenori five years (AD 622), changed the sea state Taizhou, Taizhou three genera. Taizong Zhenguan the first year (627 AD), Taizhou under the Jiangnan Circuit. Tang Tsung Qianyuan first year (785 years), said the resumption of Taizhou Linhai County, under the Zhejiang East Road. Song Ancestor Xining seven years (AD 1074), points to Liangzhe Liangzhe East, Liangzhe West, is a coastal division, Ninghai two counties, Li Taizhou. Yuan ancestor Yuan fourteen years (AD 1277), changed the way Taizhou Taizhou, eastern Zhejiang executive secretariat under the road. Local Administrative Region Ming Yuan attack system, change of Taizhou Road station state capital. Qing Ming inherited, located Jiaxing-Huzhou, Ningbo, Shaoxing, Jinhua and Quzhou strict temperature at four, three belong to the sea, Ninghai two counties, under the Zhejiang Ningbo, Shaoxing Road. Republic of China, three belong to the sea, Ninghai two counties. In twenty-nine years (AD 1940) set Sanmen County, Taizhou, under the Chief Inspector. February 17, 1949 liberation of three, is the first in Zhejiang Province liberation of the county, under the Taizhou. May 22, 1954 three counties under the jurisdiction of Ningbo. July 1957 Sanmen County, Taizhou recovery genus. May 1983, Ninghai County Salix communes classified Sanmen County. August 1994, the State Council approved, removed to build the city of Taizhou, under the Sanmen County, Taizhou City today.

Administrative regions 

Subdistricts:
Haiyou Sub-District (海游街道), Shaliu Sub-District (沙柳街道)

Towns:
Hengdu (横渡镇), Jiantiao (健跳镇), Tingpang (亭旁镇), Zhu′ao (珠岙镇), Huaqiao (花桥镇), Pubagang (浦坝港镇)

Townships:
Shepan Township (蛇蟠乡)

Geography

Sanmen County ocean located northeast, east, southeast on three sides, the total sea area of 481.7 square kilometers, accounting for 31.9% of the total area of Sanmen County, North Ninghai connected to the sea, east and Xiangshan County waters phase, South and Linhai sea phase adjacent. Coastal Mountains and more towards the direction of the coastline into a more perpendicular or oblique. Coastline of 167 kilometers, along the coast of the stream, Pearl River tour, pavilion next to the river, head Ao River, White River, Huaqiao Creek, Mountain Creek and other streams field into the sea.

Climate

Sanmen County has a subtropical monsoon climate, with long summers and dry, cold winters. Spring is short, with four distinct seasons that have abundant rainfall and is suitable for light, such as in southern Zhejiang. Zhejiang usually has humid summers while in the winter, it can get cold with slight humidity. Minimum monthly temperatures throughout the year, such as in January, tend to be on an average temperature of about 5.3 ℃; the highest monthly temperature in July tends to be on an average temperature of about 27.9 ℃; annual average temperature overall is usually 16.6 ℃, with a frost-free period of 242 days. Seasonal distribution occurs throughout the year, through Spring and Autumn, with summer lasting more than four months, while winter usually lasts about two months.

By the maritime monsoon, which can have abundant rainfall, the average annual rainfall is about 1645.3 mm, a larger interannual variability of precipitation, which has a interannual difference of up to 1200 mm. Changes in annual precipitation has two rainy seasons and two relatively opposing dry season of bimodal distribution, from March to June being the first rainy season; July has a relatively light rain period; from August to September by the typhoon season, it has the second rainy season in October - the second in February for the second period is relative to small drizzles. Marsh water mountain precipitation is most abundant, with Sanmen County being the storm center, with the average annual precipitation being about 1700 mm. The average annual sunshine is usually 1863.7 hours.

Cuisine

One particular piece of cuisine that could be found here is Sanmen crab, which is well known in China for its delicious taste.

The popularity of said crab has created a saying that is used in Sanmen for advertising the crab: "San men crabs, walking all over the world."

Famous Sights

Sanmen has some famous sights, such as Shepan Island, Mushao beach, and Duobaojiang Temple.

Language

The people of Sanmen speak Wu, a language native to the region.

References

External links 
 Sanmen, China official website (English translation from Google) Retrieved on 2009-10-14.
 

County-level divisions of Zhejiang
Taizhou, Zhejiang